Maheen Rizvi is a Pakistani television actress and model. She is best known for her role as Saahira in a 2013 drama serial Bashar Momin.  She has also appeared in Bilqees Kaur (2011), Adhuri Aurat (2013), Zindagi Gulzar Hai (2013), Digest Writer and Iqraar (2015). For her work in Digest Writer she was nominated as Best Supporting Actress at 3rd Hum Awards.

Career 
In 2011, Maheen made her debut in the hit drama serial ’Maat’. Her role was very concise but she got noticed immediately and her performance made an impact on the viewers instantly. During the same year she bagged a supporting role in ’Zard Mausam’ and highly acclaimed drama ’Bilqees Kaur’ where she played the role of a college student. Her Punjabi getup, body language and dialogue delivery made an impact on the viewers. Not only did she act in ’Bilqees Kaur’ but also assisted the director during the New York spell. In 2012 she was offered a serial Adhoori Aurat which aired on Geotv in 2013. She was appreciated for her  role as a vamp and also received an award for it in 2014. It was after this particular serial that people started taking her work very seriously. In 2013, Rizvi did a TVC for Pampers  which was shot in Cape Town, South Africa. Upon return she was offered the role of an Antagonist in a Pakistani Drama Serial titled ’ Bashar Momin’. The Drama became a worldwide success and her character of Saahira was acclaimed as one of the best negative roles in Pakistani Drama Industry and her style was copied by many .

Education 
Rizvi early schooling from St.Joseph's Convent High School and then left for USA after completing college at DCW. She
received her Bachelor's degree in Television Production and Film making from Denver, Colorado.

Personal 
She married Rehman Saiyed on December 22, 2014. They are said to have been in a relationship since early 2014. Rizvi now resides in Baltimore with her husband and daughter.

Filmography 

 Bilqees Kaur (2011) 
  Maat (2011) 
 Zard Mausam (2012)  
 Coke Kahani (2012)  
 Pehli Aandhi Mausam Ki (2012)  
 Silvatein (2012)  
 Adhuri Aurat (2012) 
 Kis Din Mera Viyaah Season 3 (2013) 
 Kalmoohi (2013) 
 Bashar Momin (2013)
 Zindagi Gulzar Hai (2013) 
 Digest Writer (2014)
 Nazdeekiyan (2014)
 Koi nahin Apna (2014)
 Iqraar (2015)
 Zinda Dargor'' (2015)

Telefilms-

Express Telefilms - Darr

Aasha ki asha - Tv one

Awards and nominations

 4th Pakistan Media Awards: Best Emerging Talent Female - won 
 3rd Hum Awards: Best Supporting Actress - Nominated

References

External links 

 

Living people
Muhajir people
People from Karachi
Pakistani television actresses
Year of birth missing (living people)